Megaloastia is a genus of spiders from Western Australia, which is placed in the jumping spider family, Salticidae. The genus has only one species, Megaloastia mainae.

References

Salticidae
Spiders of Australia
Arthropods of Western Australia
Monotypic Salticidae genera